Chungbuk Science High School is a special-purpose public school for students aged 15–18, located in the province of Chungcheongbuk-do, South Korea. The school is a science high school for gifted students in mathematics and science. It opened on March 6, 1989.

The school's motto is "Humanity (인격, 人格), Creativity (창의, 創意), Sincerity (성실, 誠實)".

History

1988. 4. 13. Ministry of Culture and Education approved to establish Chungbuk Science High School
1988. 11. 17. First entrance exam (capacity : 60 people)
1989. 3. 1. Inauguration of KeonSu Son (손건수), as the first principal
1989. 3. 6. First entrance ceremony
1991. 2. 12. First completion ceremony
1991. 3. 1. Inauguration of ByeongHak Kim (김병학), as the second principal
1991. 6. 15. CheongWun Dorm.(청운학사) Constructed
1994. 3. 1. Inauguration of HyukJung Yun (윤혁중), as the third principal
1997. 9. 1. Inauguration of EunDu Lee (이은두), as the 4th principal
1999. 3. 1. Changing capacity of one grade to 46 people
1999. 9. 1. Inauguration of DeokGue Lee (이덕규), as the 5th principal
2000. 9. 1. Inauguration of GyuTak Yeon (연규탁), as the 6th principal
2003. 9. 1. Inauguration of JongTae Lee (이종태), as the 7th principal
2004. 3. 1. Remodeling reading room
2004. 12. 22. Remodeling CheongWun Dorm.
2005. 9. 1 Inauguration of ChungHwan Seon (손충환), as the 8th principal
2006. 8. 14 Remodeling Physics and Earth Science Lab.
2007. 2. 28 Remodeling Chemistry and Biology Lab.
2007. 2. 28 Remodeling Library
2009. 3. 1 Inauguration of Jinwan Kim (김진완), as the 9th principal
2010. 2. 11 19th graduation ceremony and 20th early graduation ceremony (369 and 555 people total)
2010. 3. 1 Inauguration of Hee Jeong (정희), as the 10th principal

External links
 

High schools in South Korea
Educational institutions established in 1988
1988 establishments in South Korea